Gingee taluk is a taluk of Viluppuram district of the Indian state of Tamil Nadu. The headquarters of the taluk is the town of Gingee.

Demographics
According to the 2011 census, the taluk of Gingee had a population of 422,880 with 213,162 males and 209,718 females. There were 984 women for every 1,000 men. The taluk had a literacy rate of 63.41%. Child population in the age group below 6 was 20,329 Males and 18,804 Females.

References 

Taluks of Villupuram district